Elie  is an unincorporated community recognized as a local urban district in the Rural Municipality of Cartier in the Canadian province of Manitoba.

Geography
The Assiniboine River forms the northern boundary of the municipality of Cartier. Other significant communities around Elie include St. Eustache, Dacotah and Springstein.

History
In the early-1980s, Telidon videotex technology was being tested across Canada. Elie was chosen as one of the test beds, with the then government owned Manitoba Telephone System.

June 2007 tornado

On June 22, 2007, Elie was hit by an F5 tornado, the most powerful ever recorded in Canada, which damaged a flour mill and destroyed several houses, ripping two well-built houses off their foundations. A car was also thrown , but the tornado only caused one injury and no deaths, as the people had an early warning which provided them with enough time to look for protection. Warnings were provided by Environment Canada.

Demographics 

Economy
The primary industry of Elie is agriculture. The CHMI-DT Transmitter was constructed in 1986 and is located here. A health care centre, a licensed daycare, a bank, a post office, a pharmacy, a grocery shop, a petrol station, an automotive service centre, agricultural equipment service centres, recreational vehicle sales and servicing, and an insurance agency are some of the businesses in this town.

References

Designated places in Manitoba
Local urban districts in Manitoba